The 1844 Connecticut gubernatorial election was held on April 1, 1844. Former state legislator, Amistad lawyer and Whig nominee Roger Sherman Baldwin was elected, defeating incumbent governor and Democratic nominee Chauncey Fitch Cleveland with 49.41% of the vote.

Although Baldwin won a plurality of the vote, he fell short of a majority. The state constitution at the time required that in such a case, the Connecticut General Assembly decides the election. The state legislature voted for Baldwin, 116 to 93, and Baldwin became the governor.

General election

Candidates
Major party candidates

Roger Sherman Baldwin, Whig
Chauncey Fitch Cleveland, Democratic

Minor party candidates

Francis Gillette, Liberty

Results

References

1844
Connecticut
Gubernatorial